Kurtoed Gewog (Dzongkha: ཀུར་སྟོད་) is a gewog (village block) of Lhuntse District, Bhutan. It is inhabited by speakers of the Kurtöp language.

References 

Gewogs of Bhutan
Lhuntse District